The Hilina Slump, on the south flank of the Kīlauea Volcano on the southeast coast of the Big Island of Hawaiʻi, is the most notable of several landslides that ring each of the Hawaiian Islands. These landslides are the means by which material deposited at a volcano's vents are transferred downward and seaward, eventually spilling onto the seabed to broaden the island.

Current movement of the Hilina slump and recent volcanic activity, coupled with evidence of massive submarine slides in the geological past, has led to claims that megatsunamis might result if the south flank of Kīlauea should suddenly fail.

Geology 

The Hawaiian Islands are volcanoes, the newest part of the Hawaiian-Emperor seamount chain, created by eruption of magma from the Hawaiʻi hotspot. As the Pacific plate, moving to the northwest, carries the existing volcanoes away from the hotspot, new volcanoes form at the southeastern end. The newest and largest island is the Big Island of Hawaiʻi, formed by the merger of seven volcanoes. The largest, at the trailing edge of the island, is Mauna Loa Volcano, and on its seaward flank is the younger Kīlauea, with the still submerged Kamaʻehuakanaloa Seamount (formerly Lōʻihi) just off-shore.

The Hawaiian volcanoes are shield volcanoes, distinguished from the more familiar stratovolcanoes by their greater breadth and lower gradient slopes. (E.g.: Kilauea's average slope to the east is only 3.3°, and the south slope from the summit to the ocean floor averages only 6°.) When the volcano is over the hotspot a plentiful supply of magma allows it to build a broad shield; when it loses its supply of magma it dies and is eroded back to sea level.

Like the rest, Kīlauea is composed of alternating subaerial and submarine lava flows fractured by cooling joints and interbedded with weaker rock, sediments, and tephra, resulting in what has been characterized as a fractured rock mass. These discontinuities form zones of weakness that lead to slope failure. The weight of the rock mass causes extension (stretching) downhill, favoring the formation of vertical structures, such as dip-slip faults and rift zones, parallel to the slope. These disconnect the rock mass from the upper flank, putting more stress on any non-vertical planes of weakness, which may fail and form a slip zone.

In their 1999 paper, Smith and Malahoff discussed “magma-jacking” as a major cause of slope failure for the Hilina Slump. Magma jacking occurs when fresh magma is injected into pre-existing fractures or weak rock. The pressure of the injected magma serves to break apart the rock, leading to slope failure. Smith and Malahoff also proposed that Kīlauea's status as a secondary volcanic structure on the flanks of the larger Mauna Loa makes it more susceptible to catastrophic collapse. They observed that this trend holds true for many of the historic landslides observed in the Hawaiian island chain.

On Kīlauea's seaward flank (where it is not resting against Mauna Loa) these tendencies are evident where magma oozing out of the caldera turns east and west to form the Southwest Rift Zone (SWRZ) and East Rift Zone (ERZ), both parallel to the shore, and also in the cliffs of the Hilina Pali – coincident with dip-slip faults of the Hilina fault system – which form the head-scarp where a large block of rock has slumped down and outward.

The rift zones enable transport of lava tens of kilometers away from the caldera (as seen in the current lower Puna eruption). They also serve as wedges, forcing the south flank of Kīlauea downslope across a décollement – a nearly horizontal fault where the volcanic deposits rest on the oceanic crust – about 8 to 10 km deep.

Hilina Slump 
On the central portion of the south flank of Kīlauea the thousand-foot high cliffs of the Hilina Pali and similar scarps were recognized as early as 1930 as headscarps resulting from slumping of the coast. Whether this slump is shallow, or reaches down to the décollement that underlies the entire Kīlauea south flank, is still under debate.

With the discovery in the late 1980s that the entire south flank of Kīlauea is involved with submarine landslides the term "Hilina slump" has been applied by some scientists to the broader area.

The Hilina slump is sliding seaward on top of the southern flank of the Kīlauea volcano, at an average speed of 10 cm/year (3.9 in/year). Kīlauea is the southeastern portion, about 13.7%, of the Big Island of Hawaii. Model results based on present day slope and sea level suggest that earthquake accelerations stronger than about 0.4 to 0.6 g are enough to exceed the static friction coefficient resulting in a slip along a failure surface. However, recent undersea measurements show that an undersea "bench" has formed a buttress at the forefront of the Hilina Slump, and "this buttress may tend to reduce the likelihood of future catastrophic detachment."

Earthquakes 

Earthquakes in Hawaiʻi result from either movement of magma, or sliding of the volcanic edifices which comprise the islands. Some of the seaward slippage of the flank occurs aseismically, without noticeable earthquakes. At other times there is a lurch, resulting in an earthquake of magnitude 6 or greater.

1868 
An earthquake on April 2, 1868, rocked the southeast coast of Hawaiʻi with a magnitude estimated between 7.25 and 7.75. A tsunami claimed 46 additional lives. The villages of Punaluʻu, Nīnole, Kāwāʻa, Honuʻapo, and Keauhou Landing were severely damaged.

1975 

A similar earthquake occurred November 29, 1975, with a magnitude of 7.2. Oceanfront properties were washed off their foundations in Punaluʻu. Two deaths were reported at Halape, and 19 other persons were injured. The shoreline at Keauhou Bay was dramatically altered.

2018 

It appears to have been precipitated by vibrations caused by the movement of magma in the eastern rift zone of Kīlauea, and in turn, the earthquake preceded further volcanic activity. This could fit into a model of correlation between earthquakes and eruption events described for the earthquakes in 1868 and 1975.

Landslides 
The breadth and gentle slopes of young shield volcanoes such as Kīlauea are in contrast to the steep, picturesque cliffs (pali), deeply incised canyons, and narrow ridges typical of the older islands, and for a long while it was a bit of mystery how the latter got that way. In 1930 it was suggested that (at least in some cases) this might be the result of large landslides. In 1964 it was noted that certain areas of sea floor with very blocky topography lay downslope from what appear to be giant amphitheaters (the large bowl left at the head of landslides), suggesting the possibility of giant landslides. However, that such mass wasting was a ubiquitous feature of Hawaiian geology was not recognized until systematic mapping of the sea floor in the late 1980s identified 17 areas on the flanks of the islands that appear to be the remnants of large landslides. One of these areas is the south flank of Kīlauea, including the Hilina Slump, which is currently in motion. This has raised concern that failure of the south flank of Kīlauea could generate a tsunami that "may threaten cities in the Pacific region", and that even relatively minor displacement of the Hilina Slump "would be truly disastrous to life and property on Hawaii island, the rest of the archipelago, and possibly the Pacific Rim."

While the Hawaiian archipelago faces a significant threat from even relatively minor local events, the threat to other trans-Pacific regions has been deemed "exaggerated". Debris avalanches, or flows, "commonly represent a single episode of rapid failure", where the potential energy of the slide is released suddenly, and could cause giant tsunamis. On the other hand, slumps are largely intact and undeformed blocks that are wider — up to  — and thicker — about  — than debris avalanches, and generally slow moving. Slumps commonly move on a concave surface, with the head dropping down almost vertically (as seen at the Hilina Pali and related cliffs), and the toe thrusting upward.

Seaward movement of Kīlauea's flank has been largely halted on the western end by the Kamaʻehuakanaloa and Papaʻu seamounts, and slowed east of the Hilina Slump by the Hohonu Seamount. Additional buttressing of Hilina Slump is provided by a "Midslope Bench" (see detailed map above); catastrophic detachment of this landslide is deemed unlikely, and "dire predictions of the future breakaway of the Hilina slump ... may be overstated".

Megatsunamis 
Would the collapse of a flank of a Hawaiian volcano result in "towering waves crash[ing] with the force of countless atomic bombs onto the coastlines of North America and eastern Asia"?

Coupled with the knowledge that the Hawaiian islands are ringed with debris fans where large portions of the various volcanoes have slid into the sea – the volume of the Hilina slump has been estimated at  – it seems reasonable to consider the risk of volcanic and/or seismic activity in Hawaiʻi wreaking havoc around the Pacific Rim.

Pararas-Carayannis concluded that neither geology nor historic events indicate that Kīlauea's southern flank is "unusually unstable or that a massive collapse is possible in the foreseeable future", but even if such a collapse happened as postulated the far-field effects of the resultant tsunami "have been greatly overstated".

See also 

 Geology of Hawaii
 Evolution of Hawaiian volcanoes
 Nuʻuanu Slide

References

Sources 

.

.

.

.

.

.

.

.

.

.

.

.

.

.

.

.

.

.

.

.

.

.

.

.

.

.

.

.

.

.

.

.

.

.

  

Landforms of Hawaii (island)
Tsunamis in the United States
Landslides in the United States
Kīlauea